Michael Ridenton (born 28 March 1968) was a footballer who represented New Zealand at international level.

Ridenton made his full All Whites debut in a 4–0 win over Taiwan on 11 December 1988 and ended his international playing career with 40 caps including 14 A-international caps to his credit, his final cap - an appearance in a 0–3 loss to Australia on 6 June 1993.

References

External links

1968 births
Living people
New Zealand association footballers
New Zealand international footballers
Association football defenders